Shera may refer to:

People
Shera (Indian bodyguard), Indian celebrity bodyguard
Jack Shera, Canadian politician of the Northwest Territories 
John Shera (1840–1906), New Zealand politician
Mahabali Shera, Indian professional wrestler
Mark Shera, American actor

Other uses
She-Ra, a fictional character and the heroine in the Filmation cartoon and series of toys produced by Mattel called She-Ra: Princess of Power as well as the Netflix series She-Ra and the Princesses of Power
Shera (mascot), the mascot for the 2010 Commonwealth Games
Shera (film), a 1999 Indian film
Shera, Hansot, a place in Gujarat, India